The Foundation for Religious Sciences John XXIII is a research institution in Bologna, Italy, presided by Valerio Onida and directed by Alberto Melloni, which publishes, shapes, serves, organizes, receives and communicates research within religious sciences with a particular view to Christianity and other religions with which it has come in contact.

The foundation, established in 1953, is recognized by decree of the President of the Italian Republic and has agreements with Bologna University and other institutions: it operates under absolute autonomy both in relation to churches and universities. It is open to public and private funding, as well as that of foundations, companies, cooperatives and to ties with other centers. The foundation intends to give continuity to the scientific research in the area of historical cultural activities begun by the intuition of Giuseppe Dossetti (1913–1996) and which developed thanks to the intellectual passion of Giuseppe Alberigo (1926–2007) who, for nearly 50 years, was its soul and secretary.

From this consideration is derived a non-antiquarian taste for research and the conviction that rigorous knowledge of historical processes is an adequate and exhaustive way to participate in the collective intellectual and spiritual dynamism by which research is continuously increased.

History

In 1953 Giuseppe Dossetti, after having left political life (which he had joined through participating in the Resistance and where he held important roles as vice secretary of the DC, founder of the association Vita Humana and as the soul of the journal Cronache Sociali) gave life to a common experience of intellectual and spiritual research. Then forty years old, he founded a group of younger adults, which settled in Bologna because of the presence of Giacomo Lercaro. At Via San Vitale 114, he began to build a specialized library that could be an adequate resource for the group. The library soon gained a size and quality rare in Italy, especially then: a rigorous vision of research and the belief that through a free and strict condition of historical, theological patristic exegetical philosophical study, one could strengthen renewal in Christianity.

In 1956 the two dimensions – the more intellectual and that which was more clearly monastic – were separated and the documentation centre (a voluntarily neutral term) continued its activities in a different relation with Dossetti, which became again quite intense after the announcement of the opening of Vatican II.

Dossetti participated in the council as an expert of Lercaro and that which had become the name of the Institute of Religious Sciences worked as a sort of workshop offering the decisive materials for the debates (Pope Paul VI expressed his gratitude to Alberigo for the volume on the doctrine of the powers of the universal church and the head of the Sant' Uffizio mons. Parente quoted him in the discussion), but also weaving vast relations (the historians and theologians Marie Dominique Chenu or Yves Congar, the biblical scholar Jacques Du Pont, the patrologist Jean Gribomont, the philosopher Ivan Illich, the ecumenist Emmanuele Lanne, the medievalist Jean Leclerq, the theologian of religions Raimon Pannikar, the dogmatic theologian Joseph Ratzinger for example beside those already consolidated with the historians and receiving unequaled intellectual stimuli.

The dramatic conclusion of the episcopate of Lercaro in Bologna and the departure of Dossetti for the Middle East did not terminate the experience of San Vitale: on the contrary, once the idea of becoming a part of the university was set aside, the research group of which Pino Alberigo was the soul and motor became bigger, becoming at the beginning of the 1970s a reference point for the formation of a generation of scholars in the most different disciplines of the historical and religious branches and the great masters of that epoch (Roger Aubert, Henri Chadwick, Eugenio Corecco, De Halleux, Georg Kretschmar, Alois Grillmeier, Rudolf Schnackenburg, Brian Tierney, Jean-Marie Tillard, Robert Trisco and others).

Once it had passed from the form of institute to that of an association recognized by law, of which the first signature was that of Benigno Zaccagnini and voted by the entire parliament, the reality of San Vitale 114 met with its last institutional metamorphosis in 1985, recommended by Nino Andreatta. For him the juridical form of the foundation was necessary in order to recognize that what had been established went beyond the life limits of the founders and protagonists. The association for the development of religious sciences of which Enzo Bianchi was president gave life to the foundation of Religious sciences John XXIII. Recognized by law, it was presided by Adreatta from 1985 to 2007.

By the beginning of the 1980s and with a new recruitment of scholars the Institute returned to concentrate itself on grand collective projects – first that mainly Italian on Pope Roncalli, from whose works started the request of collaborating on the historical question of the beatification of John XXIII of September 2000, then the mainly international group from which five volumes emerged of the History of the Second Vatican Council, translated into seven languages and the important monographs and acts of congresses emerged from the production of this work. In all these years the growth of the library – which has a shelving system designed by Dossetti himself at the beginning of the activities of the institute – has progressed without stopping making Via San Vitale a reference point for the scholars and a laboratory of formation which, without ties with any religious authority which is none other than that of loyalty and contacts with the academic work which are none other than that of scientific research, which belongs to the great European heritage.

Location
It was Angelo Saizzoni who in 1953 suggested some buildings in Via San Vitale 114 to Dossetti as a center of documentation. Since then – along with the juridical changes – these have remained the center of the present Foundation. The ancient hospital of Saint Gregory of the Incurables outside the medieval walls of the city, then hospital of the Poveri Vergognosi connected to Santa Maria della Pietà within the walls of modern Bologna, the complex of San Vitale was for many decades a religious foundation which used it as an asylum, and then for private renting which have for a long time coexisted with the library and the research group of the institute. In the first anniversary of the death of Dossetti an agreement between the university represented by its Rector Fabio Alberto Roversi Monaco, the region presided by Antonio La Forgia, the mayor of Bologna represented by the vice mayor Luigi Pedrazzi and the Foundation represented by Andreatta was announced in the presence of the then-Prime Minister Romano Prodi. The entire building was acquired by the university and leased for free for fifty years to the foundation.

A regional law and then the prime minister and then the university financed the complex restoration completed in 2003.
Thanks to a donation of 2007 by which the mayor Sergio Cofferati, has honored the agreement taken by the city council of Bologna and the financial support of the prime minister the works have begun for the residence complex which will be at via San Vitale 116 and which will be named after Nino Andreatta. Currently at Via San Vitale 114 there is a library of 2100 square meters with 5323 m of shelves, the journals occupy 900 square meters with 2759 metres of compact shelves. The areas for seminars and offices occupy 320 square meters and 330 square meters will be devoted to the residence unit.
In Milan at piazza Duomo 2, one may find the Committee for the edition of the Diaries of Roncalli.

Collaboration

The foundation participates and promotes forms of cooperation in the world of scientific research both by inviting other scholars and centers within its projects both by offering invitations and collaborating with the formation of scholars. Some of the principle experiences of research of the institute – the history of the second Vatican Council, the re-edition of the council decisions, the edition of the diaries of Roncalli, the dictionary of the historical – religious knowledge of the 20th century – have been made possible by the ties which common work has consolidated and which have become also the channels of formation for the new generation of scholars.

Today the major scientific collaborations are those begun with: Bei Da, Beijing University for the exchanges and researches on the theme of Imago Dei; Chair Ben Ali, Tunis, for the research on Pacem in Terris; Ecole Francaise de Rome, Academy of Sciences of Moscow, Brown University, Pernambuco University, Excellenzcluster Münster, for the research on Pius XI to which collaborate Lucia Pozzi and Alberto Guasco; Thesaurus Linguae Graecae, Irvine, California, for the research on the councils.

Scientific committee
The scientific committee supervises and evaluates the scientific activity in its entirety and the theses and is composed of:

Claus Arnold, Professor of Church History at Goethe University Frankfurt (Germany)
Francesco Citti, University of Bologna (Italy)
Philippe Marie Berthe Raoul Denis, Professor of History of Christianity at the School of Religion and Theology of the University of KwaZulu-Natal (South Africa). He has directed the Sinomlando Center, School of Theology, University of KwaZulu-Natal since 1996.
Frédéric Gugelot, School for Advanced Studies in the Social Sciences (France)
Gaetano Lettieri, Sapienza University of Rome (Italy)
Yan Li Ren, Academic of the Far East Studies class of the Biblioteca Ambrosiana (Italy).
Jürgen Miethke, Heidelberg University (Germany)
John Pollard, University of Cambridge (United Kingdom)
Violet Soen, KU Leuven (Belgium)
Christoph Theobald, Centre Sèvres (France)
Cardinal Roberto Tucci SJ has been a director of Civiltà Cattolica, then president of Vatican Radio.
An emeritus member is Professor Peter Hünermann of Tübingen.

See also 

 Bologna School (history)

External links
 Fondazione per le Scienze Religiose

Research institutes in Italy